The Banks Peninsula District is a former territorial authority in New Zealand.

Banks Peninsula District was formed through the 1989 local government reforms. It amalgamated with the Christchurch City Council in March 2006. It was governed by a mayor and district councillors.

See also
Districts of New Zealand

References

Politics of Canterbury, New Zealand